Morphew is a surname. Notable people with the surname include:

 Christopher Morphew (born 1967), American academic 
 John Morphew (died 1720), English publisher
 Margaret Morphew (1916–1987), South African tennis player 
 Melissa Morphew (born 1963), American poet

See also
 Queen of Hearts (musician), English musician; born Elizabeth Morphew